Cinguloterebra is a genus of sea snails, marine gastropod mollusks in the family Terebridae, the auger snails.

This genus is no longer accepted and has become a synonym of Terebra Bruguière, 1789

Description
Shell slender with a noded subsutural band. The variably decorated remainder of the whorls together appears as an ornamented belt.

Species
Species within the genus Cinguloterebra include:

Species brought into synonymy
 Cinguloterebra adamsii (E.A. Smith, 1873): synonym of Terebra adamsii (E. A. Smith, 1873)
 Cinguloterebra anilis (Röding, 1798): synonym of Terebra anilis (Röding, 1798)
 Cinguloterebra binii (Aubry, 2014): synonym of Terebra binii (Aubry, 2014)
 Cinguloterebra boucheti (Bratcher, 1981): synonym of Terebra boucheti (Bratcher, 1981)
 Cinguloterebra caddeyi (Bratcher & Cernohorsky, 1982): synonym of Terebra caddeyi (Bratcher & Cernohorsky, 1982)
 Cinguloterebra commaculata (Gmelin, 1791): synonym of Terebra commaculata (Gmelin, 1791)
 Cinguloterebra connelli (Bratcher & Cernohorsky, 1985): synonym of Terebra connelli (Bratcher & Cernohorsky, 1985)
 Cinguloterebra cumingii (Deshayes, 1857): synonym of Terebra cumingii (Deshayes, 1857)
 Cinguloterebra elliscrossi (Bratcher, 1979): synonym of Triplostephanus elliscrossi (Bratcher, 1979)
 Cinguloterebra evelynae (Clench & Aguayo, 1939): synonym of Terebra evelynae (Clench & Aguayo, 1939)
 Cinguloterebra eximia (Deshayes, 1859): synonym of Terebra eximia (Deshayes, 1859)
 Cinguloterebra fernandae (Aubry, 1991): synonym of Terebra fernandae (Aubry, 1991)
 Cinguloterebra floridana (Dall, 1889): synonym of Terebra floridana (Dall, 1889)
 Cinguloterebra fujitai (Kuroda & Habe, 1952): synonym of Terebra fujitai (Kuroda & Habe, 1952)
 Cinguloterebra guineensis (Bouchet, 1982): synonym of Terebra guineensis (Bouchet, 1983)
 Cinguloterebra hoaraui (Drivas & Jay, 1988): synonym of Triplostephanus hoaraui (Drivas & Jay, 1988)
 Cinguloterebra insalli (Bratcher & Burch, 1976): synonym of Terebra insalli (Bratcher & R. D. Burch, 1976)
 Cinguloterebra jefreysii (E.A. Smith, 1880): synonym of Cinguloterebra mariesi (E.A. Smith, 1880)
 Cinguloterebra jenningsi (Burch, 1965): synonym of Terebra jenningsi (R. D. Burch, 1965)
 Cinguloterebra lima (Deshayes, 1857): synonym of Terebra lima (Deshayes, 1857)
 Cinguloterebra mamillata (Watson, 1886): synonym of Terebra mamillata (Watson, 1886)
 Cinguloterebra mariesi (E.A. Smith, 1880): synonym of Terebra mariesi (E. A. Smith, 1880)
 Cinguloterebra marrowae (Bratcher & Cernohorsky, 1982): synonym of Terebra marrowae (Bratcher & Cernohorsky, 1982)
 Cinguloterebra monilis (Quoy & Gaimard, 1976): synonym of Terebra quoygaimardi (Cernohorsky & Bratcher, 1976)
 Cinguloterebra neglecta (Poppe, Tagaro & Terryn, 2009): synonym of Terebra neglecta (Poppe, Tagaro & Terryn, 2009)
 Cinguloterebra pretiosa (Reeve, 1842): synonym of Terebra pretiosa (Reeve, 1842)
 Cinguloterebra punctum (Poppe, Tagaro & Terryn, 2009): synonym of Terebra punctum (Poppe, Tagaro & Terryn, 2009)
 Cinguloterebra raybaudi (Aubry, 1993): synonym of Terebra raybaudii (Aubry, 1993)
 Cinguloterebra russetae (Garrard, 1976): synonym of Terebra russetae (Garrard, 1976)
 Cinguloterebra salisburyi (Drivas & Jay, 1998): synonym of Terebra salisburyi (Drivas & Jay, 1998)
 Cinguloterebra serotina (A. Adams & Reeve, 1850): synonym of Cinguloterebra anilis (Röding, 1798)
 Cinguloterebra stearnsii (Pilsbry, 1891): synonym of Terebra stearnsii (Pilsbry, 1891)
 Cinguloterebra tricolor (G.B. Sowerby I, 1825): synonym of Terebra tricolor (G.B. Sowerby I, 1825)
 Cinguloterebra triseriata (Gray, 1824): synonym of Triplostephanus triseriatus (Gray, 1834) 
 Cinguloterebra vicdani (Kosuge, 1981): synonym of Terebra vicdani (Kosuge, 1981)
 Cinguloterebra waikikiensis (Pilsbry, 1921): synonym of Triplostephanus waikikiensis (Pilsbry, 1921)

References

External links

Terebridae
Gastropod genera